Scopula astrabes is a moth of the  family Geometridae. It was described by Prout in 1932. It is endemic to South Africa.

References

Endemic moths of South Africa
Moths described in 1932
astrabes
Taxa named by Louis Beethoven Prout